Jack H. Goaslind Jr. (April 18, 1928 – April 27, 2011) was a general authority of the Church of Jesus Christ of Latter-day Saints (LDS Church) from 1978 until his death. He was the seventeenth general president of the church's Young Men organization from 1990 to 1998.

Goaslind was born in Salt Lake City, Utah, to Jack, Sr. and Anita Jane Jack. As a young man, Goaslind served as a missionary for the LDS Church in the Western Canadian Mission. Goaslind had been an avid skier since childhood and by choosing to serve a mission, he passed up a chance to train for the Olympics with the United States Ski Team. After his mission, he graduated from the University of Utah and became a vice president with Affiliated Metals, Inc. Goaslind married Gwen Bradford and they had six children.

Goaslind served in the LDS Church as a bishop, stake president and a regional representative. In 1972, he was called as second counselor to Young Men general president Robert L. Backman. When the church's presiding bishopric assumed supervision of the Young Men program in 1974, Goaslind was released and served as president of the church's Arizona Tempe Mission.

In 1978, Goaslind became a general authority and member of the First Quorum of the Seventy. From 1979 to 1981, he was second counselor to Hugh W. Pinnock in the general presidency of the church's Sunday School. In 1985, he became a member of the seven-man Presidency of the Seventy, a position he held until 1987, when he became president of the church's British Isles–Africa Area. During this time, he oversaw placing Emmanuel A. Kissi in charge of the church's affairs in Ghana during "the freeze", when the government of Ghana forbade all meetings of the church. Goaslind also oversaw major humanitarian efforts of the church in São Tomé and Príncipe.

In 1990, Goaslind succeeded Vaughn J. Featherstone as general president of the Young Men. During his eight-year tenure, Goaslind had seven different men as counselors, more than any other Young Men president in history. In 1995, Goaslind was again added to the Presidency of the Seventy. He was released from the Presidency of the Seventy and from the presidency of the Young Men in 1998, when he was granted general authority emeritus status. In the leadership of the Young Men, he was succeeded by Robert K. Dellenbach, his first counselor. From 2000 to 2003, Goaslind was president of the church's Manti Utah Temple.

In 1995, Goaslind was awarded the Silver Buffalo Award by the Boy Scouts of America in recognition of his efforts to integrate Scouting into the church's Young Men program.

In 2007, he was inducted into the Order of Saint Michael of the Wing by the Royal House of Braganza, which ruled Portugal until 1910. Goaslind was selected for his humanitarian efforts in the former Portuguese colony of São Tomé and Príncipe while he was the president of the British Isles–Africa Area.

In 2011, Goaslind died in Salt Lake City at the age of 83.

References

External links
Marvin K. Gardner, "Elder Jack H. Goaslind Jr. of the First Quorum of the Seventy," Ensign, November 1978, p. 98
"Elder Jack H Goaslind, Elder Robert L. Backman of the Presidency of the First Quorum of the Seventy", Ensign, November 1985, p. 100
"Granted emeritus status," Church News, 1998-10-10
R. Scott Lloyd, "'A model of diligence and hard work'", Church News, 2011-05-06

1928 births
2011 deaths
American Mormon missionaries in the United States
Counselors in the General Presidency of the Sunday School (LDS Church)
General Presidents of the Young Men (organization)
Members of the First Quorum of the Seventy (LDS Church)
Mission presidents (LDS Church)
People from Salt Lake City
Presidents of the Seventy (LDS Church)
Regional representatives of the Twelve
Temple presidents and matrons (LDS Church)
University of Utah alumni
20th-century Mormon missionaries
Counselors in the General Presidency of the Young Men (organization)
American general authorities (LDS Church)
Latter Day Saints from Utah